Vic Emery (24 December 1920 – 14 February 2005) was an Australian cricketer. He played five first-class matches for New South Wales in 1948/49.

See also
 List of New South Wales representative cricketers

References

External links
 

1920 births
2005 deaths
Australian cricketers
New South Wales cricketers
Cricketers from Sydney